Daniel Patrick Harrington Jr. (August 13, 1929 – January 6, 2016) was an American Emmy Award-winning stage and television actor, best known for his role as building superintendent Dwayne Schneider on the sitcom One Day at a Time (1975–1984). His father Pat Harrington Sr. was also an actor.

Early life
Harrington was born in Manhattan on August 13, 1929.

His father was a song and dance man who worked in vaudeville and performed on the Broadway stage. Harrington attended a Catholic military school, La Salle Military Academy in Oakdale, New York. then graduated from Fordham University in 1950 with a bachelor of arts and subsequently received a master's degree in political philosophy, also from Fordham. During the Korean War, Harrington served as an intelligence officer with the United States Air Force, where he achieved the rank of first lieutenant.

Following in his father's footsteps, he pursued a career in entertainment after graduating from college and completing military service. He took a job at NBC in New York City. He then began acting on stage and toured North America with a number of plays, eventually performing on Broadway.

Career

Harrington became known in the 1950s as a member of Steve Allen's television comedy troupe, the "Men on the Street" (which included Don Knotts, Tom Poston and Louis Nye). He made many appearances as the comedic Italian immigrant golf pro Guido Panzini on The Jack Paar Show in the mid-1950s. In the 1959–60 season, he played the recurring role of Pat Hannigan in 11 episodes of Danny Thomas's sitcom The Danny Thomas Show.

In the 1964–1965 television season, he guest-starred on numerous programs, including the sitcom The Bing Crosby Show and Kentucky Jones (starring Dennis Weaver). In a 1965 episode of The Man from U.N.C.L.E. ("The Bow-Wow Affair"), Harrington reprised his role as Guido Panzini (who he also played in the February 8, 1966, episode of McHale's Navy "McHale's Country Club Caper"). On April 6, 1965, Harrington appeared in an episode of Mr. Novak (starring James Franciscus) titled "There's a Penguin in My Garden." He also guest-starred on two episodes of The Munsters. 

In 1967, he appeared in the Elvis Presley film Easy Come, Easy Go. He also parodied Get Smart in an episode of F Troop, in which he played secret agent "B Wise". From 1971 to 1974, he appeared in 11 episodes as District Attorney Charlie Giannetta of the ABC legal drama Owen Marshall: Counselor at Law, starring Arthur Hill in the title role.

Harrington worked as a voice actor, including Ray Palmer/the Atom and Roy Harper/Speedy on The Superman/Aquaman Hour of Adventure in 1967. From 1965 to 1969, Harrington portrayed the voices of both The Inspector (a character inspired by Inspector Jacques Clouseau) and his sidekick Deux Deux in all of the original 34 animated episodes of the character's eponymous series, created by Mirisch Films and DePatie-Freleng and released via United Artists. They later were shown as part of the Pink Panther cartoon TV show. Another cartoon voice he did was Jon's father on A Garfield Christmas Special.

In 1974, he appeared with Peter Falk and Robert Conrad in the Columbo episode An Exercise in Fatality. Harrington is best known for his role as building superintendent Dwayne Schneider on the 1975–1984 television sitcom One Day at a Time. He won both an Emmy Award and a Golden Globe Award for his work on this series. In 1979, Harrington appeared as a celebrity guest star/game show contestant on Password Plus. He reprised his role as Schneider in a series of commercials in the late 1980s for Trak Auto Parts after the show ended. He appeared in an episode of The King of Queens in 2006. 

Harrington twice appeared on former co-star Valerie Bertinelli's television shows. In 1990, he appeared on Sydney and in 2012 he appeared, in his final acting role, on Hot in Cleveland.

Personal life
Harrington married Marjorie Ann Gortner in 1955; the couple had four children, including tennis player Mike Harrington. They divorced in 1985. He married Sally Cleaver, an insurance executive, in 2001.

Death
Harrington, who had Alzheimer's disease, fell in early November 2015. He suffered a small brain hemorrhage and spent three weeks in a hospital and nursing home. Harrington's children announced his death on January 6, 2016, aged 86. He died on co-star Bonnie Franklin's birthday, though she predeceased him in 2013.

Selected filmography
{| class="wikitable"
|-
! Year
! Title
! Role
! Notes
|-
|1959|| The Danny Thomas Show ||Pat Hannigan || 11 Episodes
|-
|1963|| The Wheeler Dealers || Buddy Zack ||
|-
|1963|| Move Over, Darling || District Attorney ||
|-
|1965-1969|| The Inspector|| Inspector / Sgt Deux-Deux / Wight / Captain Clamity / Doctor / Bear || Thirty four shorts 
|-
|1967|| Easy Come, Easy Go || Judd Whitman ||
|-
|1967|| The President's Analyst || Arlington Hewes ||
|-
|1969|| 2000 Years Later || Franchot ||
|-
|1969|| The Computer Wore Tennis Shoes || Moderator ||
|-
|1969-1970|| The Pink Panther Show || Inspector / Sgt Deux-Deux ||
|-
|1972|| Every Little Crook and Nanny || Willie Shakespeare ||
|-
|1972|| The Candidate || Dinner MC || Uncredited
|-
|1973|| Savage || Russell ||
|-
|1974|| The Nine Lives of Fritz the Cat || || Voice
|-
|1975–1984
|One Day At A Time|Dwayne Schneider 
|Main actor
|-
|1985
|Murder, She Wrote|A.D.A Mel Comstock
| Footnote to Murder (season 1, episode 19)
|-
|1991
|The Golden Girls|John
|Episode “Dateline: Miami” (season 7, episode 7)
|-
|1995|| Roseanne || Himself || Episode: "Roseanne in the Hood" (season 8, episode 3)
|-
|1996|| Round Trip to Heaven || George ||
|-
|2001|| Ablaze || Stuart Ridgley ||
|-
|2005|| Curb Your Enthusiasm || Larry's neighbour ||
|-
|2012
|Hot in Cleveland|Mr. Sherdan 
|Episode “GILFs” (season 4, episode 4)
|}

Awards and honors
 1980: Golden Globe Award – Best Supporting Actor in a Television Series – One Day at a Time 1984: Primetime Emmy Award – Outstanding Supporting Actor in a Comedy Series – One Day at a Time''
2003: TV Land Awards – Nosiest Neighbor – One Day at a Time (nominated)

References

External links

1929 births
2016 deaths
20th-century American male actors
21st-century American male actors
Male actors from New York City
American male film actors
American male stage actors
American male television actors
American male voice actors
Best Supporting Actor Golden Globe (television) winners
Fordham University alumni
Deaths from dementia in California
Deaths from Alzheimer's disease
Accidental deaths from falls
Outstanding Performance by a Supporting Actor in a Comedy Series Primetime Emmy Award winners
People from Manhattan
University of California, Berkeley alumni